Morrison Cohen England Jr. (born December 17, 1954) is a senior United States district judge of the United States District Court for the Eastern District of California.

Early life and education
Born in St. Louis, Missouri, England received a Bachelor of Arts degree from the University of the Pacific in 1977 and a Juris Doctor from University of the Pacific, McGeorge School of Law in 1983. He served in the United States Army Reserve from 1988 to 2002.

Career
In 1973 he was an electronic data processing clerk for the California Department of Motor Vehicles. In 1976 he was a free agent with the New York Jets. From 1976 to 1982 he was an assistant football coach at California State University, Fullerton and California State University, Sacramento. From 1978 to 1980 he was an assistant resident manager and law clerk at FPI Management Inc in Sacramento. From 1980 to 1981 he was an on-call counselor with the Sacramento County Juvenile Court. From 1981 to 1983 he was a law clerk at the law firm of Quattrin & Clemons. England was in private practice in California from 1983 to 1988. From 1988 to 2002, he served with the United States Army Reserve, JAG Corps. From 1988 to 1996, he was a partner with the law firm of Quattrin, Johnson, Campora & England. Between 1996 and 1997, England was a judge on the Municipal Court of California in the County of Sacramento. He served as a judge on the Sacramento Superior Court for the State of California between 1996 and 2002.

District court service
England is a United States District Judge of the United States District Court for the Eastern District of California. England was nominated by President George W. Bush on March 21, 2002, to a seat vacated by Lawrence K. Karlton. He was confirmed by the United States Senate on August 1, 2002, and received his commission on August 2, 2002. He served as Chief Judge from May 1, 2012 to April 30, 2016. He assumed senior status on December 17, 2019, his 65th birthday.

Notable ruling 
On September 19, 2019, England issued a preliminary injunction against a California law which would require candidates for president to disclose their tax returns in order to be listed on the ballot.

Awards and recognition
2013: Martin Luther King Jr. Peace and Justice Award from the University of the Pacific.

See also 
 List of African-American federal judges
 List of African-American jurists

References

Sources

107-2 Hearings: Confirmation Hearings on Federal Appointments, S. Hrg. 107-584, Part 4, May 9, May 23, June 13, June 27, and July 23, 2002, * 

1954 births
Living people
African-American judges
California state court judges
Judges of the United States District Court for the Eastern District of California
McGeorge School of Law alumni
Lawyers from St. Louis
Superior court judges in the United States
United States district court judges appointed by George W. Bush
21st-century American judges
University of the Pacific (United States) alumni
20th-century American lawyers
20th-century American judges
United States Army reservists